James Healey may refer to:
James C. Healey (1909–1981), American politician in New York
James Healey (priest) (born 1944), Church of Ireland Dean of Lismore
James Healey (actor) (fl. 1970–1996), Irish actor
James Healey (Nevada politician), American politician in Nevada